Summer Camp Island is an American animated television series created by Julia Pott for Cartoon Network. Produced by Cartoon Network Studios, it premiered on July 7, 2018.

The series depicts the episodic adventures of Oscar and Hedgehog, both of whom are attending the eponymous summer camp. The show premiered with a 48-hour marathon consisting of the first 20 episodes running over an entire weekend, on both Cartoon Network and Boomerang. Another 20 episodes premiered on June 23, 2019, as the second half of the first season.

Four additional seasons premiered exclusively on HBO Max, at approximate six-month intervals from June 2020 to December 2021. The series' sixth and final season was set to be released in 2023 on HBO Max. Despite the series being removed from HBO Max in the US in August 2022, Cartoon Network had informed The AV Club that the season will air on Cartoon Network. Creator Julia Pott was not informed regarding the reason for its removal.

The series has a crossover Halloween special with We Baby Bears, which premiered on October 8, 2022.

Synopsis
Set in a world of anthropomorphic animals, Summer Camp Island follows two childhood best friends Oscar Peltzer, an elephant, and Hedgehog, a hedgehog, who are dropped off at a magical summer camp. The camp is a host to many bizarre occurrences, such as camp counselors who are popular girl witches, horses that transform into unicorns, talking sharks, yetis, haunted cabins, post-it notes that lead to other dimensions, and nosey monsters that live under the bed. Oscar and Hedgehog must contend with these out-of-place events and make their stay at camp worthwhile.

Episodes

Characters

Main
 Oscar Peltzer (voiced by Justin Felbinger in the pilot and Elliott Smith ["The First Day"–"The Library"], Asher Bishop ["Spell Crushers"–"Glow Worm"], and Antonio Raul Corbo [Season 3 onwards] in the series), an 11-year-old anthropomorphic elephant who is best friends with Hedgehog. Oscar tends to be socially awkward and slightly uncomfortable with his new surroundings. When he sets his mind to something, he will become determined to perform any task or complete any objective. He has a strong connection to Hedgehog to the point that if she disappeared or something happened to her, he becomes inconsolable, though he does learn to work without her. He believes in order and will do anything to outsmart or outdo Susie, the camp counselor. He lives in New Jersey. In the episode "Glow Worm", he is revealed to be a magical glow worm, whose magical ability which is invisible to the naked eye, is capable of making positive and happy events occur when he does something nice, dedicated, considerate and happy and gives magic to other beings.
 Hedgehog (voiced by Ashley Boettcher in the pilot and Oona Laurence in the series), an 11-year-old anthropomorphic hedgehog who is best friends with Oscar. She is the more level-headed and logical of the two. She mostly wants to help Oscar out of his comfort zone, but also wants to outdo Susie. Due to the events of "Hedgehog Werewolf", Hedgehog transforms into a werewolf at the full moon every month doing wolf activities with Betsy and the other werewolves of the island. She used to have crush on Max but she was heartbroken when she found out he wasn't interested in her. Luckily, her friends helped her get over it. She lives in New Jersey. After the events of "Spell Crushers", she finally gets her magic wand from Betsy after she passed her Witch Final Exams, but at the episode "The Library", it got confiscated by Susie after she sees her using magic spells with it. However, in the episode, "Meeting of the Minds", it was revealed that Ramona requests Betsy to teach Hedgehog magic when Susie refuses to do it herself. She asked her not to destroy her wand, but to lock it up, but Ramona lets Hedgehog learn how to do magic and insists Susie to teach her magic spells, much to both their dismay. Hedgehog enjoys playing music, radio show hosting, science and spells throughout episodes.
 Susie McCallister (voiced by Julia Pott; Poppy DeAbaitua (young)), an anthropomorphic cat, a witch and lead camp counselor. She can be mean and condescending to the campers at times. Deep down, she does display some responsible and sympathetic behavior, but would rather be rude to the campers. Despite looking and acting as a 15-year-old, she is around 400 years old as she is immortal due to drinking an immortality potion. She loves to tease and torment Oscar and Hedgehog whenever she gets the chance to do it, especially Oscar. She had Hedgehog's wand locked inside Bank of Heartforde's giant safe as she fears Hedgehog is too inexperienced to wield magic yet and worries she could cause chaos and destruction if she misuses her magic. Due to Ramona's orders, she has become Hedgehog's new magic teacher. In Season 5 in the flashback, it is revealed that her parents went missing in the North Pole when they were planned to be escorted to London with the potion to help her sister Mildred control her growing uncontrollable magic power.
 Alice Fefferman (voiced by Charlyne Yi), an anthropomorphic woolly mammoth, a witch and one of the camp's counselors and the most powerful of the three. She serves as Susie's right-hand woman but generally is not as mean to the campers as Susie is. She is very commanding, however, and would rather turn everything around her cute just to please her.
 Betsy Spellman (voiced by Nikki Castillo), an anthropomorphic horse, a witch and one of the camp's counselors. She appears to be the kindest and most down-to-earth of the witches and seems to clash with Susie at times. It is revealed in "Hedgehog Werewolf" that she herself is a werewolf, something she keeps secret from everyone except Hedgehog. She also teaches Hedgehog the ways of magic in secret especially from Susie. In Season 3, it is revealed that she is the youngest witch on the island.
 Max (voiced by Thomas Vaethroeder in the pilot and Ramone Hamilton in the series), an anthropomorphic part bat and part vampire. He is a fun-loving, wily, and also helpful kid who likes to enjoy the company of Oscar and Hedgehog. However, in the pilot he shows a more aggressive attitude towards Oscar, seeing him as somewhat of a nuisance. Everyone appears to think he is cool because of his backwards cap.

Supporting

 Pajamas (voiced by Anna Strupinsky in the pilot and Naomi Hansen in the series), a pair of sentient pajamas owned by Oscar. Believed to be gender-fluid (referred to as “she” and “he” throughout the series.)
 Pepper Corn (voiced by Sam Lavagnino [seasons 1–3], Julian Edwards [season 4 onward]), an anthropomorphic part panda and part cloud person normally seen with his security blanket. He has an innocent yet somewhat neurotic personality at times.
 Lucy Thompson (voiced by Indie Nameth), a 9 year old anthropomorphic part aardvark and part yeti. She lives in Manhattan and is very independent. She is unaware of the fact that her mother's letters are actually from Susie. She has a crush on Oscar. She can understand yeti language. Her yeti name is Bagpipes.
 Oliver (voiced by Andre Robinson), an anthropomorphic part dog and part monster who is musically gifted.
 Alexa (voiced by Alexa Nisenson) and Lem Mongello (voiced by Daphne Thomas [season 1]; Mattea Quin [seasons 2-4]; Mykal-Michelle Harris [seasons 5-present]), two anthropomorphic giraffes who are sisters.
 Alexa, part giant who is athletic and active. She likes sports very much. Multiple times throughout the series, she is seen watching over and protecting Lem like a parental figure. In "Oscar & Hedgehog's Melody", she is good at knitting during Talent Show rehearsal. In "Computer Vampire", she temporarily became a mountain goat after Oscar failed to finished Fruit Farmer game.
 Lem, who is the youngest camper. She is shown to have a very strong relationship with her older sister Alexa, even sharing the same cabin as her sibling. In "Lem is Nothing", it is revealed that Lem has a jealousy of Alexa most of the time, but also a bit of a clinginess to her. She attended the camp with a fake invitation, and is therefore the only member of the camp without a magical identity.
 Dr. P. Shark (voiced by Judd Hirsch [pilot] and Richard Kind [series]), an anthropomorphic talking shark who lives in the pool by Oscar's cabin. He is revealed to be a therapist.
 Barb Goldberg (voiced by Whoopi Goldberg), a hard working elf and friend to Oscar and Hedgehog. In the fifth season, it is revealed Barb has been around since the dawn of time.
 Howard (voiced by Mike Birbiglia), a grey monster with glasses who inhabits the island. He is friends with Oscar and the other campers.
 Ava (voiced by Fortune Feimster), a black-spotted dalmatian-like monster who inhabits the island. In "Ava's Yard Sale", it is revealed that she is Blanche's girlfriend.
 Mortimer (voiced by Bobby Moynihan), a blueish grey rabbit-like monster who inhabits the island. In Season 5, he is revealed to be former student from Harvard University.
 Blanche (voiced by Alia Shawkat), a brown horned monster who inhabits the island. In "Ava's Yard Sale", it is revealed that she is Ava's girlfriend.
 Melvin (voiced by Bobby Moynihan), a small orange monster who inhabits the island.
 Margot (voiced by Kimiko Glenn), a purple winged monster who inhabits the island.
 Godmonster (voiced by Brenda Vaccaro), an elderly purple monster who inhabits the island.
 Freddie (voiced by Cole Sanchez), an infant blue monster who lives in Heartforde.
 Paulette (voiced by Paula Poundstone), a brown monster who works at Heartforde Herald.
 The Sun (voiced by Melanie Lynskey), a New Zealand-accented sun who is indifferent to those around her.
 The Moon (voiced by Cedric the Entertainer), the friendly moon who is friends with Oscar and Hedgehog.
 Monster Under the Bed (voiced by Judd Hirsch [pilot] and Alfred Molina [series]), a monster who resides under Hedgehog's bed.
 Sue Peltzer (voiced by Kathleen Wilhoite), an anthropomorphic elephant and Oscar's mother.
 Andy Peltzer (voiced by Alfred Molina), an anthropomorphic elephant and Oscar's father.
 Saxophone (voiced by Elijah Wood), an adolescent yeti.
 Puddle (voiced by Ethan Maher), a non-binary alien who is in love with the king of their planet. They later become a couple. Later, Puddle and the King get married in "We'll Just Move the Stars".
 The King (voiced by Sam Lavagnino), Puddle's boyfriend who later becomes their husband.
 Ghost the Boy (voiced by Caleb McLaughlin (present); Xavier Patterson (Betsy and Ghost)), a ghost and Betsy's ex-boyfriend. His parents Kent and Cole are a male same-sex couple.
 Kent and Cole (voiced by Kent Osborne and Cole Sanchez) - Ghost's dads.
 Cinnamon Raisin Toast (voiced by Alia Shawkat), a piece of cinnamon raisin toast who studies journalism.
 Popular Banana Split (voiced by Nat Faxon), a jock banana split.
 Jimjams (voiced by Bobby Moynihan), Ramona's old pajamas who lives as Susie's roommate.
 Oddjobs (voiced by Aparna Nancherla), an anthropomorphic squirrel who works as a postwoman, later morale officer of UMPS.
 Ramona (voiced by Lesley Nicol; Isobel Chinnery (age 8); Bella Ramsey (age 15)), an anthropomorphic sheep who is Susie's elderly friend that lives in between time.
 The Werewolf Queen (voiced by Lorraine Bracco), a tiny gray wolf cub who is in reality the leader of the island's werewolf population. After Hedgehog saved her, she bit Hedgehog as a way to say thanks.
 Stuart Stewartson (voiced by Stephen Root), a hairy dragon and former bartender from New York City.
 Butter Goth (voiced by Alia Shawkat), a gothic butter.
 Boy Band (voiced by Ethan Maher), a very popular music group of the island.
 Georgina (voiced by Kate Flannery), an anthropomorphic beaver and artist.
 Dungeon Doug (voiced by Justin Felbinger), an anthropomorphic dog and the swordsman who is the main protagonist from the book of same name.
 Skadi (voiced by Betsy Sodaro), a giant and cloud puncher.
 Mallory (voiced by Jo Firestone), an anthropomorphic alligator and a witch.
 Agatha, an anthropomorphic raccoon and a witch.
 Opie (voiced by Aparna Nancherla), an anthropomorphic dog and a witch.
 Emma (voiced by Lesley Nicol), an anthropomorphic frog and a witch.
 Shortcake (voiced by Niki Yang), an alien who is miner of Strawberry Mine of Alien Planet.
 Mrs. Clarinet (voiced by Frances Conroy), yeti musical teacher.
 Yums (vocal effects by Naomi Hansen), a baby yetis.
 Fife (voiced by Jason Maybaum), a young yeti.
 Xylophone (voiced by Kevin Michael Richardson), one of the yeti elders.
 Bassoon (voiced by Doug Benson), one of the yeti elders.
 Lithophone (voiced by Keith David), the largest and oldest yeti of the island.
 Morris Mole (voiced by Wallace Shawn), an anthropomorphic mole who works as Molar Moles inspector.
 Bartholomole (voiced by John Hodgman), an anthropomorphic mole who works as Molar Moles lawyer.
 Jabberwock (vocal effects by Frank Welker (uncredited)), the creatures those can only be seen between the seconds of the time.
 Moon Dog, an extraterrestrial dog on which Puddle and the King ride.
 Mildred McCallister (voiced by Faye Larkin), an anthropomorphic cat and Susie's long-lost younger sister who was born with overactive magical glands which made her the most powerful witch in the world. She also gained immortality like her sister by drinking the remaining immortality potion. Feeling she has caused too much trouble in England and unable to find her sister to apologize for her actions, she went to the North Pole to find their parents unaware Susie took a ship heading towards the United States of America.
 Snowflake (voiced by Lolly Adefope), a rogue snowflake that befriends Cookiesmell and later died offscreen in the middle of the episode "Shave A Little Off the Wheel".
 Cutie (voiced by Travis McElroy), an anthropomorphic rabbit that Oscar mistaken him as the demon in the tree.
 Cookiesmell (voiced by Danny Pudi), an anthropomorphic mouse who befriends snowflake.
 Time Babies (vocal effects by Ethan Maher), a humanoids which create only in the frozen time.
 Patootie (voiced by Max Mitchell), one of alien jesters.
 Noodle (voiced by Remy Edgerly), one of alien jesters.
 Glazed Ham (voiced by Lucian Perez), one of alien jesters.
 Bonbon, one of alien jesters.
 Cream Puff, one of alien jesters.
 Blob Fish (voiced by Scott Hoying)
 Ghost the Earnest (voiced by Fred Stoller)
 Gerald (voiced by Bob Balaban)
 Red-Haired Moom (voiced by Audrey Wasilewski), one of Hedgehog's ancestors.
 The Broom Maker (voiced by Richard Masur), an anthropomorphic owl and the kind broom maker who makes the broom for Hedgehog.
 Poppawoppa McCallister (voiced by Julian Barratt), an anthropomorphic cat and wizard who is Susie's and Mildred's father.
 Mrs. McCallister (voiced by Shirley Henderson), an anthropomorphic cat and witch who is Susie's and Mildred's mother.
 Striped Horse (voiced by Kate Berlant)
 Bearded Sheep (voiced by John Early)
 Professor Q (voiced by Chris Fleming), a monster teacher of Harvard University.

Production
The series is the second Cartoon Network original series to be solely created by a woman, the first being Steven Universe, which was created by Rebecca Sugar.

The series was first announced in January 2017 and later had been shopped around at different festivals, including Sundance.

In January 2022, Julia Pott announced that production on the series had ended, and she is taking a break from the animation industry to focus on writing children's books.

The series had a crossover Halloween special with We Baby Bears, which premiered on October 8, 2022.

Broadcast
The series premiered on Cartoon Network on July 7, 2018. The show's premiere marathon also happened on Cartoon Network's sister channel Boomerang on July 7, 2018. The marathon ended on July 9, 2018, at 6:00 AM. The show's premiere marathon also occurred on Teletoon on August 13, 2018. On Cartoon Network Australia and New Zealand, a sneak peek of the series was broadcast on December 15, 2018. It premiered on Cartoon Network Southeast Asia/Philippines on January 25, 2019. The show premiered on Cartoon Network UK on March 4, 2019.The show also premiered on Cartoon network India around 19 July 2019.

At San Diego Comic-Con 2018, Julia Pott announced that the second half of the first season would premiere in late 2018 on Cartoon Network with another 20 episodes. Those episodes ended up being pushed to 2019, and on May 20, 2019, it was announced that the episodes would premiere on June 23, 2019.

At San Diego Comic-Con 2019, Pott announced that the series had been renewed for a second season, which premiered exclusively on HBO Max on June 18, 2020. The third season premiered on December 10, 2020. The fourth season premiered on June 17, 2021. The fifth season was released on December 9, 2021. On December 2, Pott indicated via Twitter that the series would continue past the fifth season. The sixth and final season was set to be released on June 9, 2022 but was delayed to 2023. However, the final season aired early on Cartoon Network Italy on August 6, 2022.

Reception

Reception to the series has been positive. Journalist Abbey White of The Hollywood Reporter and Insider argued that it follows in the footsteps of Steven Universe, and praised the storyline about two non-binary aliens who love each other, with a "sweet, beautiful song," and saying that it is in an "age-appropriate way ... [which can] reach kids [so] that they can understand." Emily Ashby of Common Sense Media described the series as quirky and heartwarming, arguing that it has "cross-generational appeal", stating that there are many "quirky characters and silly adventures", many of which are relatable in their daily experiences. She also said the series has a "a welcome freshness that...yields a worthy contender for families' attention."

Home media

Accolades

References

External links
 Cartoon Network website
 

2018 American television series debuts
2010s American animated television series
2020s American animated television series
American children's animated adventure television series
American children's animated comedy television series
American children's animated fantasy television series
Animated television series about children
Cartoon Network original programming
Television series by Cartoon Network Studios
English-language television shows
Fictional islands
HBO Max original programming
Television series about summer camps
Television series set on fictional islands
Witchcraft in television
Animated television about werewolves